Molles is a commune in Allier, France.

Molles may also refer to:

Places
 Los Molles, San Luis, Argentina; a village
 Molles River, Chile; a river
 Los Molles Formation, Argentina; a geologic formation

People
 Ernest Molles, Swiss soccer player
 John Molles, 18th century Irish Anglican priest

Other uses
 Crataegus ser. Molles (Molles series); Series Molles is a botanical subgenus/superspecies taxonomic division of the genus Crataegus

See also

Molle (disambiguation)
Mollis (disambiguation)

Disambiguation pages